FreeNATS (the Free Network Automatic Testing System) is an open-source network monitoring software application developed by David Cutting under the banner of PurplePixie Systems.

FreeNATS is free software licensed under the terms of the GNU General Public License version 3 as published by the Free Software Foundation.

Overview 
 Monitoring of network services (SMTP, POP3, HTTP, ICMP (ping)
 Limited monitoring of host resources (processor load, disk usage) on a majority of network operating systems, including Microsoft Windows and Linux through agent-based testing
 Plugin design that allows users to easily develop their own service checks depending on needs, by using PHP (or other languages or scripts wrapped in PHP)
 Some ability to define network host hierarchy using "master" nodes allowing link failures to suspend monitoring
 Event-based system allowing failure notifications to be sent in customised email (suitable for email-to-SMS) or to utilise third-party notification scripts via a plug-in
 Ability to define event handlers to be run during service or host events for proactive problem resolution
 Automatic data retention cleanups
 Full web-interface for management and monitoring
 Ability to "publish" views and graphs within third-party web pages

See also 
 Comparison of network monitoring systems

References

External links 
purplepixie.org/freenats, official website
FreeNATS Wiki
Support Forum for FreeNATS
NetworkWorld.com Article on FreeNATS
PC Quest Article on FreeNATS

Internet Protocol based network software
Free network management software